Mikhail Glinsky may refer to:

 Mikhail Iosifovich Glinsky (1901–1991), Soviet general
 Michael Glinski (1460s–1534), Lithuanian / Russian nobleman